Alexander Antonio Alvarado Carriel (born 21 April 1999) is an Ecuadorian professional footballer who plays as a winger for L.D.U. Quito of the Ecuadorian Serie A.

Club career 
Alvarado joined the Deportivo Quevedo academy at the age of nine. At the age of 12 he was loaned to Canillitas Quevedo. In 2014, back with Deportivo's academy, he scored 28 goals to help the team win the youth championship and clinch the tournament's golden boot. At the end of the season, Alvarado was recruited to join the youth team at Independiente del Valle.

In 2015, Alvarado joined Deportivo Quito in Serie A where he made his senior debut but found his playing opportunities limited. He moved to Serie B side Gualaceo in 2017 in order to play regularly, making a total of 43 appearances and scoring 3 goals in his sole season with Gualaceo.

In 2018, Alvarado returned to Serie A after signing a three-year contract with Aucas.

On 13 October 2020, Alvarado joined Major League Soccer side Orlando City on loan for the rest of the 2020 season with an option to join permanently at the end of the year. He made his debut on 28 October as a 79th-minute substitute in a 4–1 win against Atlanta United. After two appearances, Alvarado had his loan move made permanent as part of the club's end of season roster moves on 2 December 2020.

On 19 January 2022, Alvarado joined Ecuadorian Serie A side L.D.U. Quito on loan for the 2022 season with an option to buy. The purchase option was exercised on 29 November 2022.

International career

Youth 
In January 2019, Alvarado was selected to represent Ecuador U20 at the 2019 South American U-20 Championship. He scored three goals as Ecuador won the tournament, qualifying them for the 2019 U-20 World Cup in the process. Alvarado retained his place in the squad and appeared in all seven matches as the team finished in third-place. He scored once, a penalty in the round of 16 victory over Uruguay.

Senior 
Alvarado made his senior international debut on 10 September 2019, entering as an 85th minute substitute in a 3–0 friendly victory over Bolivia.

Career statistics

Club

International

Honors

International 
South American U-20 Championship winner: 2019
FIFA U-20 World Cup third-place: 2019

References

External links
 

1999 births
Living people
Ecuadorian footballers
Ecuador youth international footballers
Ecuador international footballers
Association football forwards
Ecuadorian Serie A players
Major League Soccer players
C.D. Quevedo footballers
C.S.D. Independiente del Valle footballers
S.D. Quito footballers
S.D. Aucas footballers
L.D.U. Quito footballers
Orlando City SC players
Ecuador under-20 international footballers